Sir Kevin Smith  (born 22 May 1954) is a British businessman who was the chief executive, from January 2003 to 31 December 2011, of GKN plc. He joined GKN in November 1999 as managing director of GKN Aerospace.

Born in Nelson, Lancashire, he attended Burnley College and the University of Central Lancashire, earning a bachelor's degree in business studies.

Prior to GKN, he had been with British Aerospace (BAE plc) since 1980, first as a contracts officer. He advanced into the Commercial Directorate, where, by February 1990, he had become commercial director, as well as having been appointed to the Military Aircraft Ltd board. He served, lastly, as group managing director of the New Business division.

Smith was created a Knight Bachelor in 2007. Smith joined Unitas Capital as a partner in 2012. Smith joined Rolls-Royce in 2016.

Boards 
 Former non-executive director of Scottish and Southern Energy plc. 
 Served on the boards of: 
 Saab AB
 Panavia GmbH
 Eurofighter GmbH
 SEPECA
 Matra BAe Dynamics
 Claverham Group Ltd (non-executive director)
 GCHQ 
 Ministerial Sub-Committee on Smart Procurement, member

Affiliations
 Fellow of the Royal Aeronautical Society
 Companion of the Chartered Management Institute

External links
 The Daily Telegraph coverage of Smith's appointment as British trade ambassador
 GKN/China
 Cranfield University website

1954 births
Living people
Alumni of the University of Central Lancashire
British chief executives
Businesspeople awarded knighthoods
Knights Bachelor
People from Nelson, Lancashire